A legal recourse is an action that can be taken by an individual or a corporation to attempt to remedy a legal difficulty.

 A lawsuit if the issue is a matter of civil law
 Contracts that require mediation or arbitration before a dispute can go to court
 Referral to police or prosecutor for investigation and possible criminal charges if the matter is a criminal violation
 Petition to a legislature or other law-making body for a change in the law if a law is thought to be unjust.
 Petition to a president or governor or monarch other chief executive or other official with power to pardon.

See also

Legal principles 
 Habeas corpus
 Damnum absque injuria, loss without injury
 Arm's length principle
 Sovereign immunity. The immunity of state officials or state entities to torts with respect to its subjects.

Examples 
 Arranged marriages may leave the woman without legal recourse.
 Bookies and confidence tricksters  to block legal recourse.
 Victims of bullying may have legal recourse in the United States.
 The Class Action Fairness Act of 2005 purportedly leaves consumer groups without legal recourse.
 Diploma mills and essay mills employ various legal techniques to leave their customers without legal recourse.
 In termination of employment, an employee may have legal recourse to challenge such a termination in at-will presumption of employment in the United States.
 Victims of joke theft have little legal recourse, but have occasionally exacted their own vengeance.
 Lynchings
 Military tribunal
 Rumsfeld v. Padilla

Legal terminology